Nikolaus Peter "Nik" Rettinger III (born August 1990) is an American political staffer and Republican politician from Waukesha County, Wisconsin.  He is a member of the Wisconsin State Assembly, representing Wisconsin's 83rd Assembly district since January 2023.  He isalso  chairman of the Republican Party of Wisconsin's 1st congressional district and chairman of Wisconsin Young Republicans.

Biography
Nik Rettinger was born and raised in Waukesha County, Wisconsin, and graduated from Waukesha South High School in 2008. He was a boy scout and achieved the rank of Eagle Scout in 2008.  After graduating from high school, he attended the University of Wisconsin–Milwaukee at Waukesha where he earned his associate's degree in 2011.  He went on to the University of Wisconsin–Milwaukee and earned his bachelor's degree in 2014 with a double major in history and political science and government.  He was active in student government on both the Waukesha and Milwaukee campuses; he was president of student government in Waukesha in 2010.

Political career
Rettinger began his political activity in high school, starting a political club to get students involved in local campaigns.  During his first semester at the University of Wisconsin–Waukesha, he interned with the Republican Party of Wisconsin for the 2008 election.  After completing his bachelor's degree, he served an internship with United States senator Ron Johnson.  He was then hired as a staffer in the Wisconsin State Assembly, working as a legislative assistant for representative David Craig and then as a research assistant for representative Jesse Kremer.  In 2019, he was hired as chief of staff for state senator André Jacque.

In addition to his official duties, Rettinger has been active on the campaign and party organization side.  He was elected first vice chair of the Republican Party of Waukesha County and chairman of the Republican Party of Wisconsin's 1st congressional district.  He is also state chairman of the Wisconsin Young Republicans and a member of the board of the Young Republican National Federation.

In January 2022, he co-founded Campaign Tutors, a private company which sells campaign tutorials for aspiring political candidates.  His partners in the project are state representative Cody Horlacher and his wife.

The 2022 redistricting, carried out by the Wisconsin Supreme Court in April 2022, moved the district lines such that incumbent 83rd Assembly district representative Chuck Wichgers was moved into the 82nd Assembly district, creating an open seat in the 83rd district.  Four days after the Wisconsin Supreme Court decision, Rettinger announced his candidacy for the 83rd Assembly district, launching with Wichgers' endorsement, as well as endorsements from his business partner representative Cody Horlacher, his state senator Julian Bradley, and former Wisconsin governor Scott Walker.  He faced a relatively competitive primary, but defeated Waterford village trustee Pat Goldammer with 58% of the vote.  He went on to win 78% of the general election vote in the heavily Republican district.  

He will take office in January 2023.

Personal life and family
Nik Rettinger is married to school teacher Sidney Steinmann.  They reside in the village of Mukwonago, Wisconsin.

Electoral history

Wisconsin Assembly (2022)

| colspan="6" style="text-align:center;background-color: #e9e9e9;"| Republican Primary, August 9, 2022

| colspan="6" style="text-align:center;background-color: #e9e9e9;"| General Election, November 8, 2022

References

External links
 Campaign website
 
 Nik Rettinger at Wisconsin Vote
 Nik Rettinger at LegiStorm
 Campaign Tutors

1990 births
Living people
Republican Party members of the Wisconsin State Assembly 
People from Waukesha, Wisconsin
People from Mukwonago, Wisconsin
21st-century American politicians
University of Wisconsin–Milwaukee alumni
Legislative staff